The Venezuela national beach soccer team represents Venezuela in international beach soccer competitions and is controlled by the FVF, the governing body for football in Venezuela.

Current squad
Current as of August 2011.

Current staff
 Manager: Roberto Cavallo
 Technical Assistant: Luis Moreno
 Head Delegation: Rafael Almarza

Achievements
 FIFA Beach Soccer World Cup Best: Fifth place
 2000
 CONMEBOL Beach Soccer Championship Best: Third Place 
 2011

References

External links
 BSWW Profile

South American national beach soccer teams
Beach Soccer